The 2009–10 Indiana Hoosiers men's basketball team represented Indiana University in the 2009–10 college basketball season. Their head coach was Tom Crean, in his second season with the Hoosiers. The team played its home games at the Assembly Hall in Bloomington, Indiana, and was a member of the Big Ten Conference. They finished the season 10–21, 4–12 in Big Ten play and lost in the first round of the 2010 Big Ten Conference men's basketball tournament.

2009–10 Roster

Recruiting class

Schedule and results

|-
!colspan=12 style=| Regular season

|-
!colspan=12 style=| 2010 Big Ten tournament

Indiana Hoosiers
Indiana Hoosiers men's basketball seasons
2009 in sports in Indiana
2010 in sports in Indiana